Valentin Edward "Vic" Hoffinger (January 1, 1901 – March 22, 1976) was a Russian-born Canadian professional ice hockey player who played 26 games in the National Hockey League. Born in Selz, Russian Empire, but raised in Saskatoon, Saskatchewan. He played for the Chicago Black Hawks.

Hoffinger was also coach for the German Olympic hockey team in the 1930s. He married Bernice Scholl. Hoffinger became a podiatrist after his hockey career.

References

External links

1901 births
1976 deaths
Canadian ice hockey defencemen
Chicago Blackhawks players
Detroit Olympics (IHL) players
Emigrants from the Russian Empire to Canada
Germany men's national ice hockey team coaches
Ice hockey people from Saskatchewan
London Tecumsehs players
People from Odessky Uyezd
People from Odesa Oblast
People from the Russian Empire of German descent
Sportspeople from Saskatoon
Ukrainian emigrants to Canada
Ukrainian people of German descent